Antonio M. Serapio (June 13, 1937 – February 19, 2007) was a lawmaker from Valenzuela, Philippines. He represented Valenzuela's lone district from 1987 to 1998 and the second district from 2004 until his death in 2007. He died due to heart attack, following a vehicular accident in Nueva Ecija.

Antonio M. Serapio Elementary School in barangay Ugong was named after him.

Notes

External links
 "Personal Information, Antonio Serapio." (April 22, 2009).

1937 births
2007 deaths
People from Tacloban
People from Valenzuela, Metro Manila
Nacionalista Party politicians
Members of the House of Representatives of the Philippines from Valenzuela, Metro Manila
Road incident deaths in the Philippines
Deaths from heart disease